Đà Bắc is a rural district of Hòa Bình province in the Northwest region of Vietnam.

Districts of Hòa Bình province
Hòa Bình province